Handball has been a South Asian Games event since 2010 for men's and since 2016 for women's.

Pakistan is most successful team in men's handball event winning 2 gold and 1 silver medal, ahead of their arch rivals India. Pakistan won gold in the 2010 and 2019 edition of the South Asian Games beating India by 37–31 and 30–29 respectively. In the 2016 edition, Pakistan lost to the hosts India, score being 32–31.

In women's handball event, India is at top winning 2 gold medals.

Summary

Men
Handball event for men was added to the South Asian Games in its 11th edition held at Dhaka, Bangladesh.

Women
Handball event for women was added to the South Asian Games in its 12th edition held at Guwahati, India.

Medal table

Men

Women

References

External links

 
Sports at the South Asian Games
Handball at multi-sport events
Handball competitions in Asia